Pseudosimochromis babaulti is a species of cichlid endemic to Lake Tanganyika preferring areas with rock-rubble substrates.  It can reach a length of  TL.  It can also be found in the aquarium trade.

Etymology
The specific name honours the collector of the type, the French explorer, naturalist and conservationist Guy Babault (1888-ca. 1932).

References

External links 
 Photograph

babaulti
Taxa named by Jacques Pellegrin
Fish described in 1927
Taxonomy articles created by Polbot
Taxobox binomials not recognized by IUCN